Scratchy: The Complete Reprise Recordings is a 2005 compilation album released by the group Crazy Horse. It is a re-issue of the first two Crazy Horse albums, Crazy Horse and Loose, on Reprise Records, with bonus tracks and the first single by the pre-Crazy Horse group Danny & The Memories.

The album went out of print in 2006. It was briefly released in Europe in 2006 under the title The Complete Reprise Recordings 1971-'73, without the Danny & The Memories single. In 2013, Wounded Bird licensed the release and reissued the album using the original track listening and mastering. The booklet from the original release was replaced by a four-page booklet with credits for the album.

Track listing

Disc One
"Gone Dead Train" (Nitzsche, Titelman) – 4:06
"Dance, Dance, Dance" (Young) – 2:10
"Look at All the Things" (Whitten) – 3:13
"Beggar's Day" (Lofgren) – 4:28
"I Don't Want to Talk About It" (Whitten) – 5:18
"Downtown" (Whitten, Young) – 3:14
"Carolay" (Nitzsche, Titelman) – 2:52
"Dirty, Dirty" (Whitten) – 3:31
"Nobody" (Lofgren) – 2:35
"I'll Get By" (Whitten) – 3:08
"Crow Jane Lady" (Nitzsche) – 4:24
"Hit and Run" (Blanton) - 2:42
"Try" (Whitsell) - 3:18
"One Thing I Love" (Leroy) - 2:37
"Move" (Whitsell) - 3:14
"All Alone Now" (Whitsell) - 2:47
"All the Little Things" (Leroy) - 5:01
"Fair Weather Friend" (Leroy) - 2:42
"You Won't Miss Me" (Whitsell) - 2:47
"Going Home" (Leroy) - 2:50
"I Don't Believe It" (Whitsell) - 3:07
"Kind of Woman" (Blanton) - 4:25
"One Sided Love" (Whitsell) - 3:12
"And She Won't Even Blow Smoke in My Direction" (Whitsell) - 1:21

Disc Two
"Dirty, Dirty" (Alternate Version) 		2:42
"Scratchy" (Takes 1-3) 		12:47
"Dear Song Singer" 		2:50
"Downtown" (Unedited Long Version) 		10:42
"Susie's Song" (Takes 1-5) 		4:25
"When You Dance You Can Really Love" 		3:12
"Radio Spot" 		1:21
"Can't Help Loving That Girl of Mine" - 45rpm single by Danny & The Memories 		3:54
"Don't Go" - 45rpm single by Danny & The Memories - 2:02

References

2005 compilation albums
Crazy Horse (band) albums
Rhino Handmade compilation albums
Reissue albums